This is a list of airlines currently operating in Saint Pierre and Miquelon.

See also
 List of airlines

Saint Pierre and Miquelon
Airlines
Saint Pierre and Miquelon
Saint Pierre and Miquelon